The Golden Globe Award for Best Supporting Actor – Motion Picture is a Golden Globe Award that was first awarded by the Hollywood Foreign Press Association in 1944 for a performance in a motion picture released in the previous year.

The formal title has varied since its inception; since 2005, the award has officially been called "Best Performance by an Actor in a Supporting Role in a Motion Picture".

Six actors have won the award twice: Richard Attenborough, Edmund Gwenn, Martin Landau, Edmond O'Brien, Christoph Waltz, and Brad Pitt.

Winners and nominees

1940s

David Brian - Intruder in the Dust

1950s

1960s

1970s

1980s

1990s

2000s

2010s

2020s

Multiple nominations

5 nominations
 Jack Nicholson

4 nominations
 Ed Harris
 Brad Pitt

3 nominations
 Red Buttons
 Robert Duvall
 Hugh Griffith
 Philip Seymour Hoffman
 Al Pacino
 Joe Pesci
 Christopher Plummer
 Jason Robards

2 nominations
 Ben Affleck
 Eddie Albert
 Mahershala Ali
 Fred Astaire
 Richard Attenborough
 Jeff Bridges
 Michael Caine
 James Coco
 Sean Connery
 Tom Cruise
 Willem Dafoe
 Bruce Dern
 Leonardo DiCaprio
 Melvyn Douglas
 Charles Durning
 Ralph Fiennes
 Albert Finney
 Morgan Freeman
 Henry Gibson
 Joel Grey
 Harry Guardino
 Alec Guinness
 Edmund Gwenn
 Gene Hackman

 Anthony Hopkins
 Dennis Hopper
 John Huston
 Samuel L. Jackson
 Tommy Lee Jones
 Raul Julia
 George Kennedy
 Ben Kingsley
 Martin Landau
 Jude Law
 Jared Leto
 Paul Mann
 Bill Murray
 Paul Newman
 Edward Norton
 Edmond O'Brien
 Laurence Olivier
 Tony Randall
 Sam Rockwell
 Gilbert Roland
 Geoffrey Rush
 Telly Savalas
 Peter Ustinov
 Jon Voight
 Christoph Waltz
 Oskar Werner
 Gig Young
 Efrem Zimbalist Jr.

Multiple wins

2 wins
 Richard Attenborough (consecutive)
 Edmund Gwenn
 Martin Landau
 Edmond O'Brien
 Brad Pitt 
 Christoph Waltz

See also
 Academy Award for Best Supporting Actor
 BAFTA Award for Best Actor in a Supporting Role
 Independent Spirit Award for Best Supporting Male
 Critics' Choice Movie Award for Best Supporting Actor
 Screen Actors Guild Award for Outstanding Performance by a Male Actor in a Supporting Role

References

External links

Golden Globe Awards
 
Film awards for supporting actor